Bzebdine is a municipality in Baabda District, Mount Lebanon Governorate, Lebanon.

References 

Populated places in Baabda District